Seaside Plantation House, also known as Locksley Hall, is a historic plantation house located at Edisto Island, Colleton County, South Carolina. It was built about 1810, and is a -story, Federal style brick dwelling with a gable roof. The house is one room deep with a long porch across the southeast elevation and sits on a raised basement. The central portion of the house is stuccoed brick with frame additions on the first floor.

It was listed in the National Register of Historic Places in 1982.

References

External links

Historic American Buildings Survey in South Carolina
Plantation houses in South Carolina
Houses on the National Register of Historic Places in South Carolina
Federal architecture in South Carolina
Houses completed in 1810
Houses in Colleton County, South Carolina
National Register of Historic Places in Colleton County, South Carolina